Mark Christopher Steinmetz (born 1961) is an American photographer. He makes black and white photographs "of ordinary people in the ordinary landscapes they inhabit".

Steinmetz's work was shown in a group exhibition at the Museum of Modern Art, New York in 1993/1994 and in solo exhibitions at the Ogden Museum of Southern Art in 2015, the High Museum of Art in 2018 and at Fotohof in Salzburg, Austria in 2019. He is the recipient of a Guggenheim Fellowship.

His work is held in the collections of the Art Institute of Chicago, Hunter Museum of American Art, Museum of Contemporary Photography, Chicago, Metropolitan Museum of Art, Whitney Museum of American Art and Museum of Modern Art, New York, and Nelson-Atkins Museum of Art.

Life and work
Steinmetz was born in New York City and raised in the Boston suburbs of Cambridge and Newton until he was 12. He then moved to the midwest before, aged 21, he went to study photography at the Yale School of Art in New Haven, Connecticut. He left that MFA program after one semester and in mid 1983, aged 22, moved to Los Angeles in search of the photographer Garry Winogrand, whom he befriended. He moved to Athens, Georgia in 1999 and was still living and working there as of 2017.

Steinmetz makes photographs "of ordinary people in the ordinary landscapes they inhabit", and "in the midst of activity". Most of his work has been made in the USA but also in Berlin, Paris, and Italy. His books combine portraits (portrait-like but spontaneous) and candid photos of people, and also include animals and still life photos. He finds many of his subjects whilst walking around but he has also spent time at Little League Baseball and summer camps.

Steinmetz predominantly works with black and white film, usually medium format, developed and printed in his own darkroom. He has mostly worked the same way with the same film, chemicals, and cameras since beginning in the mid 1980s.

Publications

Books of work by Steinmetz
Tuscan Trees. The Jargon Society, 2002. With text by Janet Lembke. .
South Central. Portland, OR: Nazraeli, 2007. .
Second edition. Paso Robles, CA: Nazraeli, 2020. .
South East. Portland, OR: Nazraeli, 2008. .
Second edition. Paso Robles, CA: Nazraeli, 2020. .
Greater Atlanta. Portland, OR: Nazraeli, 2009. .
Second edition. Paso Robles, CA: Nazraeli, 2020. .
Philip and Micheline. TBW, 2010. Subscription Series #3, Book #1. . Elaine Stocki, Dru Donovan, and Katy Grannan each had one book in a set of four.
The Ancient Tigers of My Neighborhood. Six by Six, Set 1. Portland, OR: Nazraeli, 2010. Anthony Hernandez, Todd Hido, Raymond Meeks, Martin Parr, and Toshio Shibata each had one book in a set of sex. Edition of 100 copies.
Italia: Cronaca di un Amore. One Picture Book 64. Portland, OR: Nazraeli, 2010. .
Idyll. Orchard Volume Three. Silas Finch, 2011. With Raymond Meeks. . Some include the separate volume Pastoral by Steinmetz, in an edition of 90 copies.
Summertime. Portland, OR: Nazraeli, 2012. .
Paris in my Time. Portland, OR: Nazraeli, 2013. . Edition of 1000 copies.
The Players. Paso Robles, CA: Nazraeli, 2015. . Edition of 1000 copies.
Fifteen Miles to K-Ville. London: Stanley/Barker, 2015. .
Angel City West: Volume One. NZ Library Set Two, Volume Six. Paso Robles, CA: Nazraeli, 2016. . Edition of 350 copies.
Angel City West: Volume Two. NZ Library Set Three. Paso Robles, CA: Nazraeli, 2017. . With an introduction by John Bailey. Edition of 350 copies.
Past K Ville. London: Stanley/Barker, 2018. .
Angel City West: Volume Three. NZ Library. Paso Robles, CA: Nazraeli, 2019. . Edition of 350 copies.
Carnival. London: Stanley/Barker, 2019. .
Summer Camp. Paso Robles, CA: Nazraeli, 2019. .
Cats. One Picture Book Two #16. Paso Robles, CA: Nazraeli, 2020. .
Berlin Pictures. Berlin: Kominek, 2020. With a text by Thomas Weski. .

Books with contributions by Steinmetz
Glister. New Jersey, USA: Glister, 2020. Photographs by Christopher Anderson, JH Engström, Steinmetz, John Sypal, and Ed Templeton. With a transcript of an interview with Templeton.

Exhibitions

Solo exhibitions
South, Ogden Museum of Southern Art, New Orleans, 2015
united states pt 2, Germany, 2017
Terminus, High Museum of Art, Atlanta, 2018
united states, Fotohof, Salzburg, Austria, 2019

Group exhibitions
New Photography 9: Christopher Giglio, Boris Mihailov, Mark Steinmetz, and Beat Streuli, Museum of Modern Art, New York, 1993/1994

Awards
1994: Guggenheim Fellowship from the John Simon Guggenheim Memorial Foundation

Collections
Steinmetz's work is held in the following public collections:
Art Institute of Chicago: 5 prints (as of January 2019)
Hunter Museum of American Art, Chattanooga, TN: 2 prints (as of January 2019)
Metropolitan Museum of Art, New York: 2 prints (as of January 2019)
Museum of Contemporary Photography, Chicago: 1 print (as of January 2019)
Museum of Modern Art, New York: 23 prints (as of January 2019)
Nelson-Atkins Museum of Art, Kansas City, MO: 5 prints (as of January 2019)
Whitney Museum of American Art, New York: 5 prints (as of April 2021)

References

External links

1961 births
Living people
American photographers
Artists from New York City